This is a list of chapters of Delta Omicron.

List of chapters

Collegiate
Delta Omicron has a total of 129 collegiate chapters, 36 of which are currently active.

Alumni
Delta Omicron has 45 Alumni chapters and Clubs, 14 of which are currently active.

International Chapters
Delta Omicron has eight international chapters, all of which are inactive.  Seven are collegiate chapters, and one is an alumni chapter.

Inactive chapters are indicated by a *.

References

Lists of chapters of United States student societies by society
chapters